Ruth Winifred Cracknell AM (6 July 1925 – 13 May 2002) was an Australian character and comic actress, comedienne and author, her career encompassing all genres including radio, theatre, television and film. She appeared in many dramatic as well as comedy roles throughout a career spanning some 56 years. In theatre she was well known for her Shakespeare roles.

Early life
Cracknell was born in 1925 in Maitland, New South Wales to Charles and Winifred Cracknell. When she was four years old, the family moved to Sydney. She was educated at North Sydney Girls High School and, after graduating, worked at the Ku-ring-gai Council as a clerk. At 17 she was taken to the theatre by a friend. She immediately wanted to become an actress and joined the Modern Theatre Players drama school.

Career

Radio and theatre
Cracknell's first acting jobs were in radio. By 1946, she was performing five episodes of radio plays a week. She also performed on stage with the Sydney-based companies the Independent Theatre and the Mercury Theatre. In 1948, she joined the John Alden Company and had roles in King Lear, Measure for Measure and The Tempest. In 1952, at the age of 27, she left Australia to work in London for two years.

Screen
Cracknell appeared in many TV serial productions, and made for TV films. One of her first roles was Reflections in Dark Glasses, a one-off drama broadcast in 1960 and the 1973 award-winning ABC-TV dramatisation of Ethel Turner's Australian children's classic Seven Little Australians. She was a hostess of children television series Play School in the mid to late 1960s. In the 1980s she guest starred in A Country Practice.

Cracknell is best known for her role in the ABC television series Mother and Son. Written by Geoffrey Atherden, who previously had written The Aunty Jack Show, he based the series on the writer's own family experience. Mother and Son first screened on 16 January 1984; it continued for six seasons for over a decade and is often repeated. Cracknell played an elderly woman, Maggie Beare, who was slowly becoming senile. She was cared for by her long-suffering younger son Arthur (Garry McDonald), to whom she was often indifferent but on whom she was also dependent and whom she often cynically played off against her self-centred older son Robert (Henri Szeps) and daughter-in-law Liz (played by Judy Morris).

Cracknell appeared in film productions including opposite Chips Rafferty in the 1958 classic Smiley Gets a Gun, The Chant of Jimmie Blacksmith (1978), the 1983 The Night the Prowler in 1978 and The Dismissal as Margaret Whitlam in 1983. Later in 1996, she starred opposite Toni Collette in Lilian's Story as Sydney eccentric Beatrice Miles.

Theatre companies
Cracknell acted for most of the major Australian theatre companies, especially the Sydney Theatre Company. She performed many different roles; Elaine in Williamson's

Emerald City (1987), Grandma Kurnitz in Lost in Yonkers (1992), Shafer's Lettice and Lovage Her best known role was in the stage production of The Importance of Being Earnest as Lady Bracknell. The production was so popular that it was an "ongoing" stage production from 1988 to 1992 and was televised by the ABC. She was also Patron of the Australian Theatre for Young People.

Filmography

Film

Television

Personal life and memoirs
Cracknell married Eric Phillips on 25 June 1957 and they had three children, Anna, Jane and Jonathan. Unlike many women of the time, she did not retire, but continued to act. Pictures of her wedding and she and her son can be seen in the opening credits of Mother and Son.

In 1997 Cracknell published her autobiography, A Biased Memoir, which was a best seller in Australia. In 2000 she published her memoir, Journey from Venice, which related how she and her husband, Eric Phillips, were visiting Venice when he had a paralysing stroke; she did not speak a word of Italian but she had to organise medical treatment for him and have him returned to Australia in the face of significant obstacles. He later died in a Sydney hospital.

Cracknell died of a respiratory illness in a Sydney nursing home on 13 May 2002, aged 76, shortly after a visit from her children. Paul McDermott's film The Scree, which was released in 2004, featured Cracknell's narration.

Honours and awards
In 1980, Cracknell was appointed a Member of the Order of Australia (AM). 
In 1998, the National Trust of Australia named her one of "100 National Living Treasures". 
Cracknell received honorary doctorates from the University of Sydney. and the Queensland University of Technology.

ARIA Music Awards
The ARIA Music Awards is an annual awards ceremony that recognises excellence, innovation, and achievement across all genres of Australian music.

Helpmann Awards
The Helpmann Awards is an awards show, celebrating live entertainment and performing arts in Australia, presented by industry group Live Performance Australia (LPA) since 2001. In 2001, Cracknell received the JC Williamson Award, the LPA's highest honour, for their life's work in live performance.

|-
| 2001 || Herself|| JC Williamson Award || 
|-

Logie Awards
In 2001, Cracknell was awarded the TV Week Logie Hall of Fame for her services to Australian television. Her appearance at the ceremony was the last before her death. She was the first (and for 15 years) only woman to be inducted.

 (wins only
|-
| 1993 || Herself || Most Outstanding Actress || 
|-
| 1994 || Herself || Most Outstanding Actress || 
|-
| 1994 || Herself || Most Popular Comedy Personality || 
|-
| 2001 || Herself || Logie Hall of Fame || 
|-

References

External links
 
 Australians: Ruth Cracknell, Australian Broadcasting Corporation
 Ruth Cracknell bio, National Film and Sound Archive
 

1925 births
2002 deaths
Australian film actresses
Australian stage actresses
Australian women memoirists
Australian television actresses
Australian people of English descent
Australian children's television presenters
Deaths from pneumonia in New South Wales
Helpmann Award winners
Logie Award winners
Members of the Order of Australia
People educated at North Sydney Girls High School
People from Maitland, New South Wales
20th-century Australian women singers
Australian women television presenters